Jai Chiranjeeva is a 2005 Indian Telugu-language action comedy film directed by K. Vijaya Bhaskar and produced by Vyjayanthi Movies. The movie stars Chiranjeevi, Arbaaz Khan, Sameera Reddy and Bhumika Chawla. The film's climax was shot in Los Angeles, California and one of the songs on Las Vegas strip. The film's music was composed by Mani Sharma with editing by Kotagiri Venkateswara Rao. The film released on 22 December 2005.

Synopsis
Sathyanarayana Murthy is a rough but kind man who lives in Amalapuram with his niece Lavanya, mother, sister, and brother-in-law. Sathya and Lavanya share a special bond and are the best of friends. One day, Lavanya falls off a swing in a park and dies. Sathya later finds out that she has been killed by arms dealer Pasupathi, who resides in Los Angeles. He wants to go to US avenge Lavanya's death but could not get a travel visa as he is uneducated. He meets and falls in love with Shailaja but marries Neelima as she is a US Green card holder where they both go to Los Angeles with Sathya in intention to kill Pasupathi forms rest of the plot.

Cast 

 Chiranjeevi as Sathyanarayana Murthy alias Sattipandu
 Arbaaz Khan as Pasupathi
 Sameera Reddy as Sailaja "Sailu"
 Bhumika Chawla as Neelima "Neelu"
 Venu Madhav as Venu, Sathya's friend
 Bramhanandam as Neelima's uncle
 Jaya Prakash Reddy as Ramakoti
 Rahul Dev as Asghar, Pasupathi's henchman
 Sunil as Dhanushkoti, Ramakoti's son
 Shriya Sharma as Lavanya, Sathya's niece
 Sujitha as Sathya's sister
 Sumithra as Sathya's mother
 Sameer as Sathya's brother-in-law
 Dharmavarapu Subramanyam as Sailaja's father
 Sudha as Sailaja's mother
 Vizag Prasad as Neelima's father
 M. S. Narayana as Customs Officer
 Tanikella Bharani as Visa Agent
 AVS as Church Father
 Uttej as Sathya's family friend
 Naramalli Sivaprasad as Ramakoti's assistant
 Ping Pong Surya as Rasool
 Rajitha

Soundtrack

Home media
The DVD of Jai Chiranjeeva was released by KAD Entertainment on February 7, 2006

Remakes
The film was dubbed into Hindi and Tamil as Bajrang and Deva respectively. It was remade in Bangladeshi Bengali as Ziddi Mama starring Shakib Khan & Apu Biswas.

Awards
 Nandi  Award for Best Audiographer - Madhusudhan Reddy

References

External links
 

2005 films
2000s Telugu-language films
2005 action films
Films set in the United States
Films shot in California
Films shot in Hyderabad, India
Films set in Hyderabad, India
Indian action films
Indian films about revenge
Telugu films remade in other languages
Films directed by K. Vijaya Bhaskar
Films scored by Mani Sharma